Vittorio Piscopo (24 October 1913 – 20 November 2004) was an Italian painter. His work was part of the painting event in the art competition at the 1948 Summer Olympics. He was a part of the Neapolitan Futurist Movement in 1933, as well as an exponent of circumvisionismo, a Neapolitan avant-garde movement under fascism.

References

1913 births
2004 deaths
20th-century Italian painters
Italian male painters
Olympic competitors in art competitions
Painters from Naples
20th-century Italian male artists